Carlo Rossi (27 November 1920 – 16 May 1989) was an Italian lyricist and record producer.

Born in Rome, Rossi started his career as a writer of humorous poems and short stories. He entered the music industry as the lyricist of the songs composed by Edoardo Vianello, many of which became classics in Italy. He also wrote songs for other singers, including Rita Pavone, Massimo Ranieri, Paul Anka and Alunni del Sole.

References

External links 
 Carlo Rossi at Discogs

1920 births
Italian lyricists
Musicians from Rome
Italian songwriters
Male songwriters
1989 deaths
Italian record producers
20th-century Italian musicians
20th-century Italian male musicians